Altan Dinçer (20 May 1932 – 12 January 2010) was a Turkish basketball player. He competed in the men's tournament at the 1952 Summer Olympics.

References

1932 births
2010 deaths
Turkish men's basketball players
Olympic basketball players of Turkey
Basketball players at the 1952 Summer Olympics
Basketball players from Istanbul